The following railroads have been called Valley Railroad:
Connecticut Valley Railroad, 1868-1887, a defunct railroad in the state of Connecticut
Valley Railroad (Connecticut), a heritage railroad
Valley Railroad (New York), 1869-1945, predecessor of the Delaware, Lackawanna and Western Railroad
Valley Railroad (Pennsylvania), Westline to Kushequa
Valley Railroad (Virginia), predecessor of the Baltimore and Ohio Railroad
Valley Railway, former shortline in Ohio